Old Dan can refer to:

 Old Dan's Records, an album by Gordon Lightfoot
 Old Dan Tucker, an American song
 Old Dan, a hound from Where the Red Fern Grows